John Manfredo Giannini (born October 31, 1962) is an American college basketball coach. He served as the head men's basketball coach at Rowan University from 1989 to 1996, the University of Maine from 1996 to 2004, and La Salle University from 2004 to 2018.  Giannini led Rowan to an NCAA Division III men's basketball tournament championship in 1996.

Early life
The son of Italian immigrants, Giannini grew up in Elmwood Park, a suburb of Chicago, and has three younger brothers. He attended Fenwick High School in Oak Park, and received a bachelor's degree in psychology from North Central College in Naperville. Giannini also holds a master's degree in physical education with a specialization in sports psychology from North Texas University, as well as a doctorate in kinesiology with a specialization in sports psychology from the University of Illinois at Urbana–Champaign.

Coaching career

Illinois
From 1987 through 1989, Giannini served as a graduate assistant on coach Lou Henson's staff at the University of Illinois. In Giannini's final season on Henson's staff, the Fighting Illini, led by Kendall Gill, Kenny Battle, Stephen Bardo, Tyler Cottingham, Lowell Hamilton and Marcus Liberty, made the Final Four.

Rowan
Giannini's first head coaching job came at Rowan University, a Division III school, when he was hired as the men's coach in 1989. His 1992–93 team, led by Terrence Stewart, went to the Final Four. Two years later, Giannini's team was the favorite to win the national championship, but again lost in the final four. The following season, Giannini gambled in accepting two Division 1 transfers, a Division 2 transfer and added them to a team centered around Stewart. After a slow start to the season, Rowan caught fire and defeated Hope College to win the 1996 national championship.

Maine
Following Rowan's championship season, Giannini accepted the head coaching position at the University of Maine, a position he held for eight years. His Maine teams made five trips to the America East Conference semi-finals or better, and made appearances in the conference championship game two of Giannini's last three seasons. Giannini's two 20-win seasons are the only two on record in program history, and his .530 winning percentage is the highest in school history.

La Salle
On August 23, 2004, Giannini was hired as the eighteenth head coach of the La Salle men's basketball team. He succeeded Billy Hahn, who was forced to resign that July, following a rape scandal. The university had originally sought to hire Penn head coach and La Salle alumnus Fran Dunphy, but settled on Giannini after Dunphy turned the school down.

The 2005–06 season, Giannini's second at La Salle, set records for most Atlantic 10 wins in a season (ten), most Atlantic 10 road wins in a single season (four) and was the program's first winning season since the 1992–93 season, when the school competed in the Midwestern Collegiate Conference (now known as the Horizon League). Giannini was named a Jim Phelan Award candidate for National Coach of the Year. However, the 2005–06 season was one of only two seasons in which La Salle finished above .500 in Giannini's first seven seasons leading the program. Though Giannini recruited heavily in the Philadelphia area, his teams were plagued by poor chemistry and missed opportunities, and La Salle became an afterthought in the Big 5.

On March 23, 2018, Giannini and La Salle mutually agreed to part ways after 14 seasons.

Postseason breakthroughs
The 2011–12 Explorers won 21 games, the program's highest win total since 1992, and received an invitation to the 2012 NIT, the program's first postseason tournament appearance since 1992. La Salle lost its first-round game at home to eventual tournament runner-up Minnesota.

The following season, La Salle again won 21 regular season games, including consecutive victories over ninth-ranked Butler at home, and nineteenth-ranked VCU on the road. The Explorers received their first invitation to the NCAA tournament since 1992, when they received an at-large bid. In the opening round, La Salle defeated fellow thirteen seed Boise State, before defeating fourth-seeded Kansas State in the second round. After defeating twelfth-seeded Ole Miss in the third round, La Salle lost to Wichita State in the Sweet Sixteen. La Salle's appearance in the Sweet Sixteen made it only the sixth program seeded thirteenth or lower to advance that far, and its three tournament wins were the program's first since 1990. It was also the program's deepest tournament run since 1955, when the Tom Gola-led Explorer's lost in the national championship game. The team's 24 overall victories were the seventh-most in school history, and its 11 victories in the Atlantic Ten were the most ever. The Explorers also finished ranked 24th in the nation in the final USA Today Coaches Poll of the season.

Personal life
Giannini and his wife Donna have two daughters.

Head coaching record

References

External links
  La Salle profile
 Maine profile

1962 births
Living people
American men's basketball coaches
American men's basketball players
Basketball coaches from Illinois
Basketball players from Chicago
College men's basketball head coaches in the United States
College men's basketball players in the United States
Illinois Fighting Illini men's basketball coaches
La Salle Explorers men's basketball coaches
Maine Black Bears men's basketball coaches
North Central College alumni
People from Elmwood Park, Illinois
Rowan Profs men's basketball coaches
Sportspeople from Chicago
University of Illinois alumni
University of North Texas alumni